John Fleming (1743 – 28 February 1802) was a British Tory politician who sat in the House of Commons between 1774 and 1790.

He was elected at the 1774 general election as a Member of Parliament (MP) for Southampton. At the 1780 general election he was defeated by his fellow-Tory Hans Sloane, who won the seat with 249 votes to Fleming's 237.  Fleming was re-elected unopposed in 1784, and held the seat until the 1790 general election which he did not contest.

References

1743 births
1802 deaths
British MPs 1774–1780
British MPs 1784–1790
Members of the Parliament of Great Britain for English constituencies